"Ne partez pas sans moi" ("Don't Leave Without Me") is a song recorded by Canadian singer Celine Dion. The song was written by Atilla Şereftuğ and Nella Martinetti. It is best known as the Swiss winning entry at the Eurovision Song Contest 1988, held in Dublin. To date, it is the last French language song to win the contest.

Dion performed it for 600 million viewers worldwide at the contest. "Ne partez pas sans moi" was released as a single in selected countries in Europe on 2 May 1988. It topped the chart in Belgium for three consecutive weeks.

Background
The song was composed by Turkish songwriter Atilla Şereftuğ and Swiss composer Nella Martinetti. "Ne partez pas sans moi" was also included on Dion's 1988 album The Best of Celine Dion released in selected European countries in May 1988. The song appeared in Canada as B-side to "D'abord, c'est quoi l'amour". It was also featured on the French version of Dion's Incognito album. In 2005, it was included on her French compilation album, On ne change pas. A music video was released in 1988. Dion also recorded a German version of "Ne partez pas sans moi", titled "Hand in Hand".

Eurovision
It won Eurovision with 137 points, beating the 's entry "Go" performed by Scott Fitzgerald by just one point in one of the closest finishes in Eurovision history. It is considered to be one of the most popular Eurovision entries, mainly because of Dion's subsequent international success.

Commercial performance
"Ne partez pas sans moi" debuted at number one in Belgium and stayed at the top of the chart for four consecutive weeks. In Switzerland, the song peaked at number eleven and in France at number thirty-six. While the single sold 200,000 copies in Europe in two days and over 300,000 copies in total, it is one of the less commercially successful Eurovision winners. It was the first winning song not to be released in the United Kingdom or in Ireland. Although not released as a single in Canada, the song entered the chart in Quebec on 1 October 1988, spending twenty-three weeks on it and peaking at number ten.

Track listings and formats
European 7" single
"Ne partez pas sans moi" – 3:07
"Ne partez pas sans moi" (Instrumental Version) – 3:07

German 7" single
"Hand in Hand" – 3:08
"Hand in Hand" (Instrumental) – 3:07

Charts

Release history

References

1988 singles
1988 songs
Celine Dion songs
Carrere Records singles
CBS Records singles
Congratulations Eurovision songs
Columbia Records singles
Eurovision songs of 1988
Eurovision Song Contest winning songs
French-language Swiss songs
French-language Canadian songs
Eurovision songs of Switzerland
Songs written by Atilla Şereftuğ
Songs written by Nella Martinetti